John Dewar may refer to:

 Dewar's Scotch Whisky, made by John Dewar & Sons
 John Dewar (academic) (born 1959), Vice-Chancellor of La Trobe University
 John Dewar Sr. (1805–1880), founder of John Dewar & Sons
 John Dewar, 1st Baron Forteviot (1856–1929), son of John Dewar, Sr.
 John Dewar, 2nd Baron Forteviot (1885–1947), Scottish businessman and soldier
 John Dewar (RAF officer) (1907–1940), World War II Royal Air Force fighter pilot
 John A. Dewar (1863–1945), farmer and political figure on Prince Edward Island
 John Michael Dewar (1883–1941), British gynaecologist and ornithologist
 John Dewar (MP) (1740s–1795), British politician